, born , is a Japanese actor and former model based in Hong Kong.

Filmography
 Enter the Fat Dragon (2020)
 Tail Card Q1 (2018)
 Chou Fu Zhe Union (2016)
 Girls (2014)
 Firestorm (2013)
 Lucky Dog (2012)
 The First Love (2012)
 Vulgaria (2012)
 All's Well, Ends Well 2012 (2012)
 Mysterious Island (2011)
 3D Sex and Zen: Extreme Ecstasy (2011)
 The Jade and the Pearl (2010)
 Break Up Club (2010)
 Rob-B-Hood (2006)
 New Police Story (2004)

References

External links

Hayama Go at Hong Kong Cinemagic

Living people
1975 births
Japanese male models
Japanese male film actors
Japanese expatriates in Hong Kong
People from Kyoto